Eucalyptus rubiginosa is a species of tree that is endemic to Queensland. It has rough, fibrous bark, lance-shaped or curved adult leaves that are paler on the lower surface, flower buds in groups of nine or eleven, white flowers and cup-shaped or hemispherical fruit.

Description
Flowering occurs between September and November and the flowers are white.

Taxonomy and naming
Eucalyptus rubiginosa was first formally described in 1984 by Ian Brooker in the journal Australian Forest Research. The specific epithet (rubiginosa) is from the Latin word rubiginosus meaning "rusty red", referring to the colour of the bark of this tree.

Distribution and habitat
This tree grows over sandstone in forest and woodland mainly between Bauhinia Downs and Theodore especially in the Isla Gorge National Park but also in the Barakula State Forest near Chinchilla.

Conservation status
This eucalyptus is classified as "least concern" under the Queensland Government Nature Conservation Act 1992.

See also
List of Eucalyptus species

References

Trees of Australia
rubiginosa
Myrtales of Australia
Flora of Queensland
Taxa named by Ian Brooker
Plants described in 1984